The Rondo in C minor, Op. 1, for solo piano is Chopin's first published work, published in 1825, and dedicated to "Madame de Linde", the wife of the headmaster of the Lyceum at which Chopin was studying. The piece contains an "unorthodox (but entirely logical) tonal scheme". The first phase begins in C minor, moving into E major, A major, then back to C minor. The second phase moves to D major, finishing in C minor for a final statement of the theme.

Chopin premiered the work at a concert on 10 June 1825 in the auditorium of the Warsaw Conservatory. The performance gained a review in the Allgemeine musikalische Zeitung of Leipzig (probably written by Chopin's teacher Józef Elsner) praising its "wealth of musical ideas".

Robert Schumann wrote to his teacher Friedrich Wieck of the Rondo in 1832:

References
Notes

Sources
 Walker, Alan (2018). Fryderyk Chopin: A Life and Times. London: Faber

External links
 

Compositions by Frédéric Chopin
Compositions for solo piano
1825 compositions
Compositions in C minor